Paul Cuisset (born 1964) is a French programmer and designer of several video games.

Career

Paul Cuisset was the lead designer of Delphine Software International and the creator of Flashback, which was listed in the Guinness World Records as the best-selling French game of all time.

Cuisset was also the Managing Director of the video game developer Vector Cell, which he co-owned with the game developer Lexis Numerique. Cuisset designed two games under the Vector Cell banner, one of which being a remake of Flashback, but the company's titles were unsuccessful and they went bankrupt in late 2013.

Games 
Titles released involving Paul Cuisset are listed below in chronological order.

Space Harrier (1988, Atari ST)
Future Wars (1989)
Bio Challenge (1989)
Operation Stealth (1990)
Cruise for a Corpse (1991)
Flashback (1992)
Shaq Fu (1994)
Fade to Black (1995)
Time Commando (1996)
Moto Racer (1997)
Moto Racer 2 (1998)
Darkstone (1999)
Moto Racer 3 (2001)
Mister Slime (2008)
Amy (2012)
Flashback (2013)
Subject 13 (2015)
Moto Racer 4 (2016)

References

External links 
 Interview with Paul Cuisset at IGN.com
 
 

1964 births
Living people
Video game producers
Video game programmers
Place of birth missing (living people)
French video game designers